Spencer Hawken (born 6 May 1973) is a British film producer, director, writer, and former film critic. His work includes Death Walks and No Reasons.

Career
Hawken has worked as a retailer and fashion director at Debenhams, and has appeared on TV shows such as BBC's Would Like To Meet, The Big Breakfast, RI:SE and GMTV.

In 2013 he began working on Death Walks, a zero-budget horror movie that starred Francesca Ciardi, Lucinda Rhodes and Jessie Williams. He later made the film No Reasons, for which Rhodes and Williams both returned.

In August 2015 Hawken's production of Road Rage was forced to change direction when its lead actor George Cole died.

No Reasons is a thriller film directed by Hawken. The film stars Marc Bannerman, Lucinda Rhodes, Daniel Peacock, Roland Manookian, and Stuart Manning. It marks the return of Anna Karen to feature films after an eight-year break.

Since 2017 Hawken has run The Romford Film Festival. In 2020 the festival was the first physical festival in the UK post COVID-19 outbreak.

In 2021 Hawken along with Marat Akhmedjanov, led the first ever UK film delegation to Uzbekistan for the Tashkent Film Festival, since the beginning of President Shavkat Mirziyoyev's term, he has championed great change in the country and the invitation to the UK delegates was part of this change.

As of 2021 Hawken consults for Netflix with The Takedown, Mothership and You People being subjects of his consultancy.

Personal life
Hawken was born in Essex, United Kingdom, and now resides in London, United Kingdom.

Filmography
Revisited (2014) Producer
Death Walks (2016) Director
No Reasons (2016) Director
The Grey Room (2020)  Associate Producer
Mask Of The Devil (2021) Associate Producer
And I (2021) Executive Producer
Wanderland (2021) Executive Producer
Mosaic (2022) Associate Producer
Video Shop Tales Of Terror (2022) Co-Producer
The Takedown (2022) Executive Producer
The Call (2022) Associate Producer
Crossfire (2022) Executive Producer
Birds (2023) Associate Producer
Banish (2022) Executive Producer
Mothership (2022) Consultant
You People (2022) Consultant
Blakes 7 (2024) Executive Producer
Players In The Game (2024) Executive Producer
Video Shop Tales Of Terror 2 (2024) Executive Producer

References

External links

British film directors
British screenwriters
British film producers
1973 births
Living people